Zeynabad (also Romanized as Zeynābād and Zeīn Abad) is a village in Zeynabad Rural District, Shal District, Buin Zahra County, Qazvin Province, Iran. At the 2006 census, its population was 1,611, in 372 families.

References 

Populated places in Buin Zahra County